Yakuza Kiwami is an action-adventure video game developed by Ryu Ga Gotoku Studio and published by Sega. It is a remake of Yakuza, the first game in the Yakuza series, originally released on Sony's PlayStation 2. Yakuza Kiwami was released on PlayStation 3 and PlayStation 4 in Japan on January 21, 2016, and on PlayStation 4 in Europe and North America on August 29, 2017. It was also ported to Windows via Steam worldwide on February 19, 2019, to Xbox One on April 21, 2020, and to Amazon Luna on December 22, 2022. 

Like the original PlayStation 2 game, Yakuza Kiwami explores the life of a man named Kazuma Kiryu who is demoted from his clan after taking the blame for his boss's murder. After a decade in prison, Kiryu searches for his old friends who have gone missing. The remake adds extra elements to the story, including Akira Nishikiyama's corruption during Kiryu's imprisonment and constant struggles between Kiryu and his rival Goro Majima. The gameplay was improved to resemble the prequel Yakuza 0, adding more depth to the fighting system.

Sega had ideas to remake the first Yakuza game in 2015 as part of the series' 10th anniversary but were unsure about developing due to their team focused on making Yakuza 0. Following the success of Yakuza 0, Sega started working on the remake of the first game and aimed to add new elements to the story while trying to make it more enjoyable than the original game. The game was well received, earning positive sales. Critics praised the simplicity of the combat but were divided by the handling of the storyline and side missions. Nonetheless, the interactions between Kiryu and Majima were praised. Yakuza Kiwami was followed up by Yakuza 6: The Song of Life later in 2016, and another remake based on the second game titled Yakuza Kiwami 2 was also released in 2018.

Gameplay
Like the original game, Yakuza Kiwami  is an action-adventure game with role-playing elements set in an open world environment and played from a third-person perspective. The player controls protagonist Kazuma Kiryu as he explores the streets of Kamurocho, a fictional district of Tokyo based on the real-life Kabukichō district. In addition to the main story, players will randomly encounter enemies on the street to battle, as well as meet people that will offer Kiryu side quests which can be completed for rewards.

Yakuza Kiwami entirely forgoes the combat system of the original game; its combat is largely similar to the prequel Yakuza 0. Just like 0, Kiwami features four fighting styles that the player can switch between in combat: the balanced Brawler style, the slow and heavy Beast style, the weak but quick Rush style, and Kiryu's traditional Dragon style. Players will earn both money and experience points by defeating enemies or completing side quests. Experience points can be used to acquire upgrades for Kiryu such as new techniques or an extension to his health bar. Money can be spent to purchase equipment or healing items, or to play various minigames and side-activities such as gambling, karaoke, and the card battle game Mesuking. Completing certain objectives will also grant the player special Completion Point currency; this CP can be spent to receive additional bonuses, such as special items or character upgrades.

Kiwami introduces a new gameplay system called "Majima Everywhere", which replaces the Mr. Shakedown system previously present in Yakuza 0, in which rival character Goro Majima will appear frequently to challenge Kiryu to a fight. Majima will appear randomly during exploration, as well as in predetermined challenges based on the player's progress in Majima Everywhere. Majima will also sometimes appear when playing a minigame (like darts or bowling) and will challenge Kiryu. Defeating Majima in different scenarios will increase the player's Majima Everywhere rank and unlock new abilities in Kiryu's Dragon style.

Plot

Similar to the plot of the original Yakuza, the game centers around yakuza lieutenant Kazuma Kiryu, who takes the blame for Sohei Dojima's murder, committed by his sworn brother and best friend Akira Nishikiyama, spending ten years in prison before being granted parole. A free man, Kiryu discovers that Nishikiyama is now a powerful but cold-hearted yakuza boss, his childhood friend Yumi has gone missing, and everyone is searching for ten billion yen that was stolen from his former organization, the Tojo Clan. As war erupts throughout the streets of Kamurocho between many different factions (including government agents and the Triad), Kiryu decides to find Yumi and the missing money, and protect Haruka, a mysterious young girl whom everyone seems to be after. Eventually, a remorseful Nishikiyama sacrifices himself to kill Haruka's father, Kyohei Jingu, who was a corrupt politician bent on destroying the Tojo and his loved ones, while Yumi dies in Kiryu's arms from a gunshot wound. Rather than give into despair and allow himself to be arrested, Kiryu leaves the Tojo and becomes Haruka's adoptive father.

Kiwami's story also introduces two new plot lines focused on Nishikiyama and Goro Majima, a ruthless Tojo captain and Kiryu's rival. Nishikiyama's story is told in flashbacks, and focuses on his descent into madness. The day after Nishikiyama shot Dojima and Kiryu went to prison, the Dojima Family ponders about the culprit, whilst they mock Nishikiyama for his ineptitude. In 1996, the Kazama Family decides to give Nishikiyama his own "family" to control, with the expectation that he would look out for Kiryu now that he had been expelled from the Tojo Clan. However, he proves to be an incompetent leader, with his family captain Matsushige, who was hired because he was the top-earner in the Kazama Family, disrespecting him and commanding more respect among his men. As Yuko, his terminally ill sister, requires a heart transplant, Nishikiyama visits a doctor, who tells him that he needs 30 million yen to pay for it. Nishikiyama tells Matsushige to get the money for him by any means, prompting him to shake down stores in the Kazama family territory. Osamu Kashiwagi, the Kazama Family captain, violently disciplines Nishikiyama, then forgives him but tells him that Kiryu would be morally better as a leader. Nishikiyama is then fully convinced that the entire Kazama Family hates him after Futoshi Shimano accuses Kazama of deliberately giving Nishikiyama men he cannot control and that Nishikiyama should learn to care for himself instead of Kiryu. Eventually, Nishikiyama learns from Matsushige that the doctor was a fraud who already had the 30 million yen from the beginning. Nishikiyama rushes to confront him, but discovers that he has run away. Yuko dies and Nishikiyama prepares to commit seppuku, but is interrupted by Matsushige. Finally fed up with the disrespect and harassment, Nishikiyama stabs him, and confesses to Dojima's murder, before using the blood to slick back his hair, becoming the changed man Kiryu would encounter during the main story.

Majima is reintroduced as a sadomasochistic yakuza who attacks Kiryu for not wanting to fight him. Despite this, Majima is fascinated by Kiryu's stoic strength and considers him to be the perfect opponent. When Kiryu is released from prison, Majima is disappointed by his combat skills going rusty and arranges a series of elaborate and bizarre scenarios to manipulate him into fighting and thus, make him stronger. Despite the fights, Majima collaborates with Kiryu to defeat Dojima Family loyalists and even confesses to him that he does not care about avenging Shimano's death. Once Kiryu regains his combat abilities, Majima challenges him to one final fight, which he ultimately loses. However, Majima finds joy in fighting Kiryu, and promises to keep challenging him for fun.

Development

Series writer Masayoshi Yokoyama stated that Sega had plans to develop Kiwami in 2015 with the company wishing gamers enjoy the first Yakuza game on more modern quality. However, they were busy during that time making the game Yakuza 0. Positive feedback to the prequel led to the making of Kiwami. The franchise's 10th anniversary and the engine used for Yakuza 0 also provided help according to Yokoyama. The gameplay was made to be as friendly as possible to newcomers with them being options to save the game's progress whenever they wanted. There were ideas in regards to changing the cast and recordings of the original games, but the staff felt it would not be an appealing remake if there were so many changes.

Rather than make it look like a retro game retaining the elements from the original PlayStation 2 games, the gameplay was made similar to eighth generation titles, most notably Yakuza 0. Therefore, the team had to face the challenge of understanding the quality of the graphics and audio they could produce with a next generation console in contrast to the original console, which left the team wondering if there were issues with different parts of the game like the way the original Yakuza camera worked. The new voice actors include Tomokazu Sugita (who plays Shinji), however, his characterization was left to keep faithful to his bond with Kiryu despite their different ranks. The story was further expanded to increase the length while adding new minigames. The fighting system was borrowed from Yakuza 0 with a focus on grinding. Similar to that game, Yakuza Kiwami has strong depictions of violence, most notably in the Heat Action sequences the player can perform. Yokoyama stated they wanted to make them as intense as possible.

The plot was further explored to focus on the depths of characters who did not have too many appearances in the original game. Due to Goro Majima's popularity, he was made to clash with Kiryu often during sidequests. Majima's characterization was influenced by previous games to keep him motivated with the idea of strength following the events of Yakuza 0 which further focused on him. Kiwami improves the resolution, framerate, textures and loading times compared to the original game, and additional content was added to resolve some of the more confusing plot points, as well as tie the story more closely to the events of the prequel title Yakuza 0.

A steelbook edition of the game was released as part of the Western launch. A version for Windows was released on February 19, 2019. The game was released for Xbox One on April 21, 2020, and for Amazon Luna on December 22, 2022.

Reception

The game holds an average of 80 out of 100 in Metacritic indicating "generally favorable reviews". Critics praised the improvements in regards to the fighting system due to the moves Kiryu can perform, with IGN and GameSpot comparing them positively with the one of the previously Yakuza released title, Yakuza 0. Game Informer referred to it as "simple and satisfying", commenting positively on the way Kiryu can easily perform intense fighting techniques. Polygon criticized how Dragon style has to be grinded as the multiple fights against Majima might make the player lose most of their health points. On the other hand, Eurogamer praised the interactions with Majima not only for the grinding but also because of the comic appeal the character brings. While not finding the remake as appealing as other titles, Destructoid found the game overall enjoyable, however, they criticized the boss fights because of their health regenerating during combat as well their style recycled from the fighting system of Yakuza 0. While overall praising the game, Game Informer criticized the side missions because of their repetitive formula. Nevertheless, the encounters with Majima were praised. GameSpot criticised how going around Kamurocho might feel underwhelming to the players comparing it to other open worlds found in gaming.

In regards to the presentation, the critical response has been mixed. The story was noted by Polygon as being more mature and brutal than in the prequel. Eurogamer praised the additions of the cutscenes involving Nishikiyama due to the new depths Sega brought in the way Kiryu is seen becoming his nemesis. GameSpot also praised the story, calling it "captivating" as generating a contrast between the dark aspects of the main story and the comical aspects of the side missions. Game Informer had mixed thoughts about the way the story was handled because of the "melodramatic" tone and the length of the cutscenes. Destructoid reported that the cutscenes were shorter and more entertaining than the ones from Yakuza 4, most notably whenever Kiryu interacts with Haruka. Another area praised by Destructoid was the comical spin given to the encounters of Majima. IGN was harsher, believing the game's pacing, storytelling, and length were its weakest points.

For the PC port of the game, Yakuza Kiwami retained the same Metacritic score. RPGFan praised the game storyline though it felt somewhat simple and linear. Both RPGFan and PCInvasion described Kiwami as an enjoyable starting point for newcomers to the series despite its issues. Vandal felt that the port was well executed and faithful to the original PlayStation 4 game, but lamented that its text was only in English.

The game was nominated for Game, Classic Revival at the National Academy of Video Game Trade Reviewers Awards.

Sales 
The PlayStation 4 and PlayStation 3 versions were the top two best-selling games in Japan during their release week, selling 103,256 copies for PlayStation 4 and 60,427 for PlayStation 3. Sega's Chief creative officer Toshihiro Nagoshi stated that the western preorders for Yakuza Kiwami were generally good for the series. As of June 28, 2018, Yakuza 0 and Yakuza Kiwami were relaunched as PlayStation Hits. The Windows version of Kiwami was among the best-selling new releases of the month on Steam.

Sequel

Yakuza Kiwami 2, a remake of Yakuza 2 in the same style as Yakuza Kiwami, was originally released for PlayStation 4 on December 7, 2017, in Japan, and worldwide on August 28, 2018. The Windows version was released on May 9, 2019, and the Xbox One version was released on July 30, 2020.

Notes

References

External links
 
 

2016 video games

Action-adventure games
Christmas video games
Open-world video games
PlayStation 3 games
PlayStation 4 games
Sega beat 'em ups
Single-player video games
Triad (organized crime)
Video game remakes
Video games about revenge
Video games developed in Japan
Video games set in 2005
Video games set in Tokyo
Windows games
Xbox Cloud Gaming games
Xbox One games
Yakuza (franchise)